Lej da Vadret is a lake below Roseg Glacier in the Grisons, Switzerland.

See also
List of lakes of Switzerland
List of mountain lakes of Switzerland

References

Lakes of Graubünden
Lakes of Switzerland
Samedan